Harry Delamere Barter Dansey  (1 November 1920 – 6 November 1979) was a New Zealand Māori journalist, cartoonist, writer, broadcaster, local politician, and race relations conciliator.

Early life
Harry Dansey was born in Greenlane, Auckland, New Zealand, to Harry Delamere Dansey, a civil engineer, and his wife Winifred Patience Dansey (née Barter). He was of Ngāti Rauhoto of Ngāti Tūwharetoa and Tuhourangi of Te Arawa, with connections to Ngāti Raukawa.

Dansey began his education at Remuera Primary School in the Auckland suburb of Remuera. His family moved to Rotorua in 1930, where he completed the rest of his primary education, and then high school from 1934 to 1939. He had a knack for English, and his father instilled in him a love for Māori culture, somewhat influencing his career.

He married Te Rina Makarita (Lena Margret) Hikaka on 19 May 1943 at Oeo, near the town of Manaia, Taranaki.

He was a member of the 28th (Māori) Battalion during World War II in North Africa and Italy. Dansey often scouted ahead to gather intelligence information to aid the advancement of the Battalion. This required him to sketch landscapes and buildings, which he enjoyed. While in Italy, Dansey was assistant to Corporal Arapeta Awatere. He was discharged from the Army in 1946, reaching the rank of Sergeant.

Journalism career
Dansey first started his journalism career when he completed an apprenticeship with the Hawera Star, before moving on to become editor and part-owner of the Rangitikei News. His family then moved to New Plymouth where he took up a position with the Taranaki Daily News in 1952. From 1956 to 1961 he was their cartoonist and leader writer, one of the few Māori to be an editorial cartoonist. At the Taranaki Daily News he drew a comic strip with two characters, Tom Tiki (a Māori leprechaun) and his cat Puss. His humour was gentle, he used Māori culture to satirise Pākehā, and he acknowledge Māori and European cultural influences in New Zealand while having a deep knowledge of Māori culture.

He also enjoyed the freedom of freelance journalism and social commentary, contributing to the Māori-aimed magazine Te Ao Hou / The New World, and commenting on Māori issues on radio. This led to him and his family moving to Auckland where he earned the position as a writer on Māori and Pacific Island affairs at the Auckland Star.

Dansey wrote a full-length play in 1971, Te Raukura: the feathers of the albatross, which first played in 1972 at the Auckland Festival.

In the 1974 New Year Honours, Dansey was appointed a Member of the Order of the British Empire, for services to journalism and the community.

Race relations conciliator
Dansey was appointed New Zealand's second Race Relations Conciliator in 1975. This entailed investigating complaints, and mediation. He stressed the need for people to respect other cultures, and he consulted and trained in business, government, legal and professional organisations. He believed that New Zealand would develop its own unique culture, derived from both Māori and European culture. Dansey became a member of the Human Rights Commission in 1978. In 1977, Dansey was awarded the Queen Elizabeth II Silver Jubilee Medal.

Other interests and vocations
Dansey was elected to the Auckland City Council in 1971, serving until 1977. A reserve in Central Auckland was named in his honour, recognising his contribution to the city. As a medallist he designed in 1972 a medallion that was issued by the Pacific Commemorative Society to commemorate 600 years of Māori occupation of Tamaki-Makau-Rau.  In 1973, he moved to the Department of Māori Affairs to further develop the department's public relations profile.

Besides journalism, politics, cartooning and theatre, Dansey became interested in radio broadcasting, and subsequently became one of station 1ZB's first talkback hosts, and was also a frequency to current affairs programmes.

Later life and death
Dansey retired from his role as race relations conciliator in October 1979, dying a few weeks later. He was survived by his wife, three sons and one daughter.

He was buried with his relations at Muruika Cemetery in Ohinemutu, Rotorua.

Books
Works by Dansey
How the Māoris came to Aotearoa (1947)
The Māori people (1958)
Cartoons on international affairs (1958)
The New Zealand Māori in colour (1963)
Māori custom today (1971)
Other works
How the Māoris came – Written by A.W. Reed and illustrated by Dansey

References

External links 
 View material relating to Harry Dansey on DigitalNZ.

1920 births
1979 deaths
New Zealand cartoonists
People from Auckland
New Zealand Māori public servants
New Zealand Māori writers
New Zealand Māori broadcasters
20th-century New Zealand politicians
New Zealand broadcasters
Auckland City Councillors
New Zealand Members of the Order of the British Empire
Ngāti Tūwharetoa people
Tuhourangi people
New Zealand military personnel of World War II
20th-century New Zealand journalists